Italy competed at the 1970 European Athletics Indoor Championships in Vienna, Austria, from 14 to 15 March 1970.

Medalists
In this edition of the championships, Italy did not win any medals.

Top eight
Men

Women
In this edition of the championships, no Italian woman reached the top eight.

See also
 Italy national athletics team

References

External links
 EAA official site 

1970
1970 European Athletics Indoor Championships
1970 in Italian sport